Theodore David Martin (born December 21, 1960) is a lieutenant general in the United States Army who last served as the commanding general of the United States Army Combined Arms Center, commandant of the United States Army Command and General Staff College and commanding general of Fort Leavenworth from May 2021 to October 2022. Before that, he served as the Deputy Commanding General and Chief of Staff of United States Army Training and Doctrine Command (TRADOC). A graduate of the United States Military Academy at West Point, he previously served as its 73rd Commandant of Cadets.

Early life and education
Born in Massachusetts but a native of Jacksonville Beach, Florida, Martin attended the United States Military Academy and commissioned into the Army as a Second Lieutenant in 1983. His military education includes the Armor Officer Basic Course (Cavalry Track), the Infantry Officer Advanced Course, and the Naval College of Command and Staff.  

He also holds master's degrees in National Security and Strategic Studies from the Naval War College, and the United States Army War College, and a master's degree in business from Webster University.

The Martin family's military heritage harkens back more than ten generations to 1776 when Private Daniel Martin enlisted in the 1st New Jersey Infantry Regiment and fought the British during the American Revolution, including service at Valley Forge.

Martin was named for his uncle who served in the Korean War alongside his father, a conflict which has not officially ended, and rests on a ceasefire maintained by a combined division of U.S. and South Korean troops which Martin would later command from 2015 to July 2017.

Martin is married and has children.

Military career
Martin assumed duties as Deputy Commanding General/Chief of Staff, United States Army Training and Doctrine Command, March 5, 2018. In this role he has prioritized unit modernization for the battlefield of the future, including an emphasis on evasion of adversary electronic warfare systems, empowering units to "unplug and disappear" as a failsafe capability. He's also worked on a new leadership development program, pushing for greater trust and autonomy for lower leaders to act independently without layers of higher command approval, and emphasized a need for leaders to be well educated, ethically grounded, and of sound character. Previously he served in a variety of staff and leadership assignments including duty in: 

 Commanding General, United States Army Combined Arms Center, Fort Leavenworth, Kansas.
Deputy Commanding General/Chief of Staff, United States Army Training and Doctrine Command, Joint Base Langley–Eustis, Virginia
Commanding General, 2nd Infantry Division (Combined), Eighth Army, Republic of Korea.
Commanding General, Fort Irwin National Training Center and Fort Irwin
Director, Joint Center of Excellence 
Deputy Director-Training, Joint Improvised Explosive Device Defeat Organization, Fort Irwin, California 
Special Assistant to the Director of the Office of Business Transformation, Office of the Under Secretary of the Army, Washington, DC
Special Assistant to the Director of the Army Staff, Office of the Chief of Staff, United States Army, Washington, DC
 Armor Branch Chief and Chief of Combat Arms Division, Human Resources Command, Alexandria, Virginia.
 Deputy Chief of Staff (G3), 4th Infantry Division, Fort Hood, Texas and Operation Iraqi Freedom in Iraq.
73rd Commandant of Cadets at the United States Military Academy.
 Advisor, Imam Mohammed bin Saud Brigade, later the Prince Sa’ad bin Abdul Rahman Brigade, Kingdom of Saudi Arabia.
 Iraq Field Team Leader, Joint Improvised Explosive Device-Defeat Task Force, Baghdad.
Martin also served as a member of the board of managers of the Army Emergency Relief fund, an independent nonprofit dedicated to addressing financial hardships among soldiers.

Martin's successor as DCG of TRADOC was announced February 25, 2021, when Major General Maria Gervais was promoted to the rank of lieutenant general and confirmed by the Senate.

Martin's successor as Commanding General of the United States Army Combined Arms Center and Fort Leavenworth was announced 26 May 2022, when Major General Milford Beagle Jr. was promoted to the rank of lieutenant general and confirmed by the Senate. The change of command occurred in October 2022.

Social media
Martin is known for maintaining an active presence on the social media site Twitter, noted for his approachability despite his senior rank and the military's ingrained conservatism. He often solicits public input from his followers on issues pertaining to Army policy and concerns of servicemembers, and argued to Newsweek that his "risky" humor helps correct misperceptions and humanize the relationship and understanding between superiors and subordinate.

Awards and decorations

References

|-

|-

|-

|-

1960 births
Living people
United States Military Academy alumni
Webster University alumni
United States Army personnel of the Iraq War
Naval War College alumni
United States Army War College alumni
Recipients of the Distinguished Service Medal (US Army)
Recipients of the Legion of Merit
United States Army generals
United States Army Training and Doctrine Command
Commandants of the United States Army Command and General Staff College